C. K. Muraleedharan is an Indian cinematographer born and brought up in rural Kerala, is one of the most accomplished cinematographers in India. He graduated from Film and Television Institute of India, Pune in 1987 with specialisation in Cinematography. His major  works are in Hindi cinema, Telugu cinema and Malayalam cinema.

Having worked in several short movies, commercials and in television since 1987, Muraleedharan, made his debut on the silver screen with the Bollywood film Ek Chhotisi Love Story in 2002.

His daughter Karthika Muralidharan is an actress in the Malayalam film industry. He has conducted a research project on History and Practice of Cinematography in India, along with Raqs Media Collective for India Foundation for the Arts.

Cinematography

References

External links
https://www.imdb.com/name/nm1381050/
https://www.muraleedharanck.com/
https://web.archive.org/web/20190527134703/http://pandolin.com/mohenjo-daro-is-my-first-digital-feature-film-c-k-muraleedharan/
https://silverscreen.in/features/interviews/ck-muraleedharan-interview-we-dont-make-films-in-india-we-shoot-radio-plays/

Living people
Tamil film cinematographers
Malayalam film cinematographers
20th-century Indian photographers
21st-century Indian photographers
Telugu film cinematographers
Year of birth missing (living people)